Denis Tsoumou (born 9 November 1978 in Brazzaville) is a Congolese former professional footballer who played as a midfielder. He played for French clubs Saint-Priest, Gueugnon, and Chamois Niortais. At international level,  he won 15 caps for the Congo national team.

External links

1978 births
Living people
Sportspeople from Brazzaville
Association football midfielders
Republic of the Congo footballers
Republic of the Congo international footballers
AS Saint-Priest players
FC Gueugnon players
Chamois Niortais F.C. players
Ligue 2 players